The Arctic Aircraft Arctic Tern (named after the bird) is a bush plane that was produced in small numbers in Alaska in the 1970s and 1980s. It is a strengthened and modernised version of the Interstate Cadet of the 1940s. It is a high-wing braced monoplane with fixed tailwheel undercarriage. It has two seats in tandem, with the rear seat removable for added cargo carriage. It is also provided with a cargo loading door in the fuselage side to facilitate loading bulky items. Optional fittings included floats or skis in place of the wheeled undercarriage, and a ventral pod to carry extra cargo or fuel.

In 2007, the Interstate Aircraft company was planning a revised and updated Arctic Tern, with US FAA certification expected in the first half of the year.

Specifications (landplane)

See also

References

Further reading
 
 
 

1970s United States civil utility aircraft
Arctic Tern
High-wing aircraft
Single-engined tractor aircraft